Last Wedding is a 2001 Canadian comedy-drama film written and directed by Bruce Sweeney. It opened the 2001 Toronto International Film Festival. The film won several awards including the award for Best Canadian Film from the Toronto Film Critics Association.

Plot summary

Noah, a weatherproofing specialist, is preparing to marry Zipporah, a country music singer. His best friend, Peter, is a Canadian literature professor whose relationship with librarian Leslie is threatened by the arrival of beautiful student Laurel. Meanwhile, Noah's and Peter's other close friend Shane, is an architect who has a seemingly wonderful relationship with Sarah, until she graduates and lands a better job than the one he has.

Cast
 Benjamin Ratner as Noah
 Frida Betrani as Zipporah
 Tom Scholte as Peter
 Nancy Sivak as Leslie
 Vincent Gale as Shane
 Molly Parker as Sarah
 Marya Delver as Laurel
 Jay Brazeau as Noah's father
 Kevin McNulty as Rabbi
 Jillian Fargey as Record company assistant

References

External links
 

2001 films
2001 comedy-drama films
English-language Canadian films
Canadian comedy-drama films
Films directed by Bruce Sweeney
Films shot in Vancouver
Films set in Vancouver
2001 comedy films
2001 drama films
2000s English-language films
2000s Canadian films